Liparia may refer to:

Liparia, a common name for the fish species Alosa macedonica
Liparia (plant), a genus of plants in the family Fabaceae